Adriyan Rae is an American actress and medical laboratory scientist, known for her role as Elida in the short-lived Syfy drama Vagrant Queen and as Gianna Mackey in the NBC drama Chicago Fire.

Early life and education
Rae was born in Seaford, Delaware and raised by her single mother; she is of Black American, German, Native American, and Venezuelan descent. She was part of a AAU Junior Olympic Games team in track and field and field hockey. She graduated from the University of the Sciences in Philadelphia with degrees in physician assistant studies and medical laboratory science; she has also obtained a professional certification in the latter field.

Career
After moving to Atlanta, Rae began her acting career, appearing in a number of television series since 2016. In 2019, she was cast in the leading role of Elida in the SyFy science fiction drama Vagrant Queen, which ran from March 27, to June 4, 2020.
 
In 2020, Rae began co-starring in the NBC drama Chicago Fire as Gianna Mackey, the new paramedic on Ambulance 61. She left the series after nine episodes due to undisclosed private reasons.

Filmography

Film

Television

References

External links

Living people
21st-century African-American people
21st-century African-American women
Actresses from Atlanta
African-American actresses
American people in health professions
American people of German descent
American people who self-identify as being of Native American descent
American people of Venezuelan descent
Year of birth missing (living people)